Leopold Maximiliaan Felix Timmermans (5 July 1886 – 24 January 1947) is a much translated author from Flanders.
He was nominated for the Nobel Prize in Literature three times.

Life
Timmermans was born in the Belgian city of Lier, as the thirteenth of fourteen children. He died in Lier at age 60. He was an autodidact, and wrote plays, historical novels, religious works, and poems. His best-known book is Pallieter (1916). Timmermans also wrote under the pen-name Polleke van Mher.

He was a painter and drawer as well as an author.

During the first years of the Second World War, Timmermans was editor of the Flemish nationalist Volk. He also attended meetings of the Europäische Schriftsteller-Vereinigung (European Writers' League), which was initiated by Joseph Goebbels. Because of this, and because of the Rembrandt prize he received in 1942 from the University of Hamburg, he was seen by many as a collaborator, which may have caused health problems and premature death.

Bibliography

 1907: Door de dagen. Indrukken van Polleke van Mher (poems)
 1909: "Ecce-Homo" en het bange portieresken (later opgenomen in "Begijnhofsproken")
 1910: Schemeringen van de dood
 1912: Begijnhofsproken (omvattend: Binnenleiding – De waterheiligen – De sacrificie van zuster Wivina – De aankondiging of de strijd tussen Elias en de Antikrist – "Ecce-Homo" en het bange portieresken – Van zuster Katelijne en 't Lievevrouwken – Het fonteintje – Buitenleiding)
 1916: 
 1917: Het kindeke Jezus in Vlaanderen
 1918: De zeer schone uren van juffrouw Symforosa, begijntje
 1919: Boudewijn (animal fable in verse)
 1921: Anna-Marie
 1921: Karel en Elegast (adaptation)
 1922: De vier heemskinderen (adaptation)
 1922: Uit mijn rommelkast. Rond het ontstaan van "Pallieter" en "Het kindeke Jezus in Vlaanderen"
 1922: Mijnheer Pirroen (theatre play)
 1923: Driekoningentriptiek
 1923: De ivoren fluit (short stories)
 1924: De pastoor uit den bloeyenden wijngaerdt
 1924: Pieter Brugel. Speech given on 31 May 1924
 1924: Het keerseken in den lanteern (omvattend: De nood van Sinter-Klaas – Het masker – Het nachtelijk uur – In de koninklijke vlaai – 't Nonneke Beatrijs – Het verbeternishuis – De eeuwige stilte – Het eerste communiekantje – Het verksken – De begrafenis van Matantje – De verliefde moor – Zomerkermissen – O. L. Vrouw der visschen – Landelijke processie – De kerstmis-sater – Sint-Gommarus – De kistprocessie – Ambiorix)
 1924: En waar de sterre bleef stille staan (theatre play)
 1924: Het kleuterboek. Rijmpjes
 1925: Schoon Lier
 1925: De oranjebloemekens (in Vierde Winterboek van de wereldbibliotheek)
 1926: Naar waar de appelsienen groeien
 ?: In De Fortuin
 1926: Het hovenkierken Gods
 1926: Leontientje (theatre play)
 1928: Pieter Bruegel, zoo heb ik uit uwe werken geroken
 1929: Het werk van Fred Bogaerts (introduction by Felix Timmermans)
 1930: De hemelsche Salomé (toneelspel)
 1931: De wilgen (In "De stad")
 1932: De harp van Sint-Franciscus
 1933: Pijp en toebak (omvattend: De lange steenen pijp – Rond een plaats van portier – Het konijn – Het geheim der wilgen – In 't Kruis, café chantant – Het liefdekabinet – De moedwillige verkenskop – De heilige kraai – De dinsdagsche heilige – Het gehiem – De oranjebloemekens – Mademoiselle de Chanterie – Twee vertellingen voor mijne kinderen: De uil, Het zegevierend haasje)
 1934: De kerk van Strijthem (In Kerstboek 1934)
 1934: Bij de krabbekoker
 1935: Boerenpsalm
 1936: Het Vlaamsche volksleven volgens Pieter Breughel
 1937: Het jaar des heeren (Karl Heinrich Waggerl – translated from German)
 1938: Het kindeke Jezus in Vlaanderen (adapted to theatre by Karl Jacobs)
 1938: Het filmspel van Sint-Franciscus (theatre play)
 1941: De familie Hernat
 1942: Vertelsels (heruitgegeven in 1986) (comprises: De goede helpers, Perlamoena, De juwelendiefstal, De uil, Prinses Orianda en het damhert, Jef soldaat, Sint-Nicolaas en de drie kinderen, De dag der dieren, Anne-Mie en Bruintje, Het visserke op de telloor, Onze-Lieve-Heer en de koei, De bende van de Onzichtbare Hand, Het verken als kluizenaar, Pitje Sprot, De nood van Sinterklaas, Het zegevierend haasje, Het verkske, Jan de kraai)
 1942: Kindertijd (story in Bloei) 
 1943: Die sanfte Kehle (theatre play, original title: De zachte keel) (republished in 2006 by the Felix-Timmermans Kring)
 1943: Minneke-Poes 
 1943: Oscar Van Rompay (essay) 
 1943: Isidoor Opsomer 
 1943: Pieter Bruegel (theatre play) 
 1943: Een lepel herinneringen 
 1944: Vertelsels II 
 1944: Anne-Mie en Bruintje 
 1945: Vertelsels III 
 1947: Adagio (poems) 
 1948: Adriaan Brouwer
 xxxx: Lierke-Plezierke
 1965: Brevarium (omvattend: De zeer schone uren van juffrouw Symforosa, begijntjen – Driekoningentryptiek – Het hovenierken Gods – Ik zag Cecilia komen – Minneke Poes) 
 xxxx: Felix Timmermans vehaalt (comprising: Mijn rommelkas – Het verksken – Ik zag Cecilia komen – In de koninklijke vlaai – De bombardon – O. L. Vrouw der vissen – De kerstmis-sater – De uil – De moedwillige varkenskop – De lange steenen pijp – De nood van Sinter-Klaas) 
 xxxx: De goede helpers en andere verhalen (omvattend: De goede helpers – Het verken als kluizenaar – Perlamoena – De juwelendiefstal – Het verksken – Prinses Orianda en het damhert – Jef Soldaat – De bende van de onzichtbare hand – Jan de Kraai – De nood van Sinter-Klaas – Sint-Nikolaas en de drie kinderen – Pitje Sprot – Het visserke op de telloor – Het zegevierende haasje – Onze Lieve Heer en de koei) 
 1969: Jan de Kraai en andere verhalen (comprising: Jan de Kraai – Onze Lieve Heer en de koei – De nood van Sinter-Klaas – In de koninklijke vlaai – Het verbeternishuis – Het verksken – Ambiorix – In 't Kruis, café-chantant – De kistprocessie) 
 1971: Met Felix Timmermans door Vlaanderen  (comprising: Voorwoord door Lia Timmermans – Pallieter – De zeer schone uren van Juffrouw Symforosa, begijntjen – Pieter Bruegel, zo heb ik U uit Uw werken geroken – Boerenpsalm – Ik zag Cecilia komen – De pastoor uit den bloeyenden wijngaerdt) 
 1993: Pallieter in Holland – Uit mijn rommelkas – Een lepel herinneringen

See also
 Flemish literature

Sources
 Felix Timmermans

References

External links
 
 

1886 births
1947 deaths
20th-century Belgian novelists
Flemish poets
People from Lier, Belgium
20th-century Belgian dramatists and playwrights
Belgian male dramatists and playwrights
Belgian male novelists
20th-century Belgian poets
Belgian male poets
20th-century Belgian male writers